Vânători is a commune in Galați County, Western Moldavia, Romania with a population of 4,172 people. It is composed of three villages: Costi, Odaia Manolache and Vânători.

References

Communes in Galați County
Localities in Western Moldavia
Populated places on the Prut